Meir Amit (17 March 1921 – 17 July 2009) was an Israeli politician and cabinet minister. He served as the Chief Director and the head of global operations for Mossad from 1963 to 1968, before entering into politics and holding two ministerial positions. He was also widely regarded as the most successful intelligence officer and a leading political figure for Israel.

Biography
Amit was born in Tiberias as Meir Slutsky during the Mandate era, cousin of the Russian-Jewish poet, Boris Slutsky. He later adopted the name Amit which means "colleague" in Hebrew and was called Meir Amit Slutsky. At a young age, he joined kibbutz Alonim in the lower Galilee and enlisted in the Haganah. He fought for the Haganah during the 1948 Arab-Israeli War. He remained in the military and rose through the ranks to become a major general. During his military career he came to be regarded as a protégé of Moshe Dayan. In the late 1950s Amit studied at Columbia Business School in New York City, earning an MBA degree. After returning to Israel, Amit entered the Israeli intelligence community, first as a major general at the head of IDF Intelligence in 1961, and then as Mossad Director in 1963. He was the only figure in Israel's history to hold the position of Mossad chief and head of military intelligence at the same time.

As Director, he orchestrated some of the Mossad's greatest successes, including the spy Eli Cohen who penetrated the highest levels of the Syrian government.  It was also during his time that the Mossad engineered the defection of an Assyrian Iraqi pilot who flew the then new Mig-21 from Iraq to Israel.  Amit is particularly known for his success in expanding Israel's human intelligence (HUMINT), especially in the Arab world.  During the lead up to the Six-Day War in 1967, Amit had a network of informants that permeated the entire Egyptian military, providing key details for Israel's pre-emptive strike on Egyptian air bases and subsequent ground offensive. Meir Amit Slutsky also built strong personal relationships within the CIA and was a very close ally of the Americans, he was deployed on several special projects with the CIA across the globe and brought many people to justice with his creative techniques of espionage.  One of the most notable examples was in the mid-1980s when he personally recruited and help train what turned out to be one of Mossad's most successful agents. The recruit was an American from a southern Illinois town near St. Louis, Missouri.  He met Amit after transferring from Kansas University to Columbia University in New York.  His code name was Ranan, and under Amit's mentoring the nineteen-year-old American became the youngest team leader of its most prolific Kidon unit, Israel's elite espionage and assassination outfit.

Following his retirement from the Mossad, he continued to be an active voice in the intelligence community and did work for the Israeli government. Following the lead of other former generals, Amit joined the Democratic Movement for Change party, and was elected to the Knesset in the 1977 elections. He was appointed Minister of Transportation and Minister of Communications in Menachem Begin's government, but resigned both posts on 15 September 1978 after the Democratic Movement for Change broke up. Amit subsequently joined Shinui, before defecting to the Alignment (The Israeli labor party) in 1980. He lost his seat in the 1981 elections.

He was later the chairman of Israel's Center for Special Studies, and in 2003, was awarded the Israel Prize for lifetime achievement and special contribution to society and the State.

Upon news of his death in July 2009, Israeli President Shimon Peres stated:
"Entire Generations owe Meir Amit Slutsky a debt of gratitude for his immense contribution to Mossad and the defense community, a large part which remains secret now in building the strength and deterrence of Israel. He was a natural leader, whom people trusted, and at the same time he was a visionary for the state. We are proud to have a personality of his stature born in our country "

References

 Oren, Michael B. Six Days of War: June 1967 and the Making of the Modern Middle East. New York: Oxford University Press, 2002. , 145-6 p.
 Thomas Gordon.  Gideon's Spies: The Secret History of the Mossad.  New York: St. Martin's Press, 1999. , 58-60 p.

External links
 

1921 births
2009 deaths
People from Tiberias
Jews in Mandatory Palestine
Haganah members
Columbia Business School alumni
Directors of the Mossad
Israeli generals
Israel Prize for lifetime achievement & special contribution to society recipients
Democratic Movement for Change politicians
Shinui politicians
Alignment (Israel) politicians
Members of the 9th Knesset (1977–1981)
Directors of the Military Intelligence Directorate (Israel)
Ministers of Communications of Israel
Ministers of Transport of Israel
Jewish Israeli politicians